Celgene Corporation is a pharmaceutical company that makes cancer and immunology drugs. Its major product is Revlimid (lenalidomide), which is used in the treatment of multiple myeloma, and also in certain anemias. The company is incorporated in Delaware, headquartered in Summit, New Jersey, and a subsidiary of Bristol Myers Squibb (BMS).

History
Celgene was originally a unit of Celanese. In 1986, Celanese completed the corporate spin-off of Celgene following the merger of Celanese with American Hoechst.

In August 2000, Celgene acquired Signal Pharmaceuticals, Inc., a privately held company that developed pharmaceuticals to regulate disease-related genes. Signal Pharmaceuticals was rebranded as Celgene Research San Diego.

In December 2002, Celgene acquired Anthrogenesis, a privately held New Jersey-based biotherapeutics company and cord blood banking business, which is developing technology for the recovery of stem cells from placental tissues following the completion of full-term successful pregnancies. Anthrogenesis was rebranded as Celgene Cellular Therapeutics.

In 2006, Celgene certified McKesson Specialty, a specialty pharmacy, as one of a group of pharmacies contracted to launch lenalidomide (Revlimid). As a specialty drug, lenalidomide is only available through the a distribution network consisting of specialty pharmacies contracted by the company.

In March 2008, Celgene acquired Pharmion Corporation for $2.9 billion.

In January 2010, Celgene acquired Gloucester Pharmaceuticals.

In June 2010, Celgene agreed to acquire Abraxis BioScience. It purchased the biotechnology company for $2.9 billion in its expansion into drugs that attack solid tumors. Abraxis produced Abraxane, the cancer-fighting drug that can be given in high doses.

In November 2011, Celgene relocated its United Kingdom headquarters from Windsor, Berkshire, to Stockley Park, near Heathrow airport which is also the home of GlaxoSmithKline's UK operations.

In January 2012, Celgene agreed to acquire Avila Therapeutics, Inc., a privately held biotechnology company for $925 million, with $350 million in cash.

Citing a market capitalization of US$67 billion, and stock appreciation of 107%, Celgene was Forbes Magazine's number 2 ranked drug company of 2013.

In 2014, Celgene and OncoMed Pharmaceuticals joined a cancer stem cell therapeutic development agreement with demcizumab and five other biologics from OncoMed's pipeline. That same year, Sutro Biopharma entered into an agreement with Celgene Corporation to discover and develop multispecific antibodies and antibody drug conjugates (ADCs). This followed the December 2012 collaboration between the two companies and focused on the field of immuno-oncology.

In April 2015, Celgene announced a collaboration with AstraZeneca, worth $450 million, to study their Phase III immuno-oncology drug candidate MEDI4736.

That same month, Celgene announced it would acquire Quanticel for up to $485 million in order to enhance its cancer drug pipeline. Celgene had invested in Quanticel in April 2011.

In June 2015, Celgene announced it had licensed Lyceras RORgamma agonist portfolio for up to $105 million to develop its Phase I lead compound LYC-30937 for the treatment of inflammatory bowel disease. The licensing opportunity gave Celgene the option to acquire Lycera.

In July 2015, the company announced it would acquire Receptos for $7.2 billion in a move to strengthen the company's inflammation and immunology areas.

In May 2016, the company announced it would launch partnership with Agios Pharmaceuticals, developing metabolic immuno-oncology therapies.

In October 2016, the company acquired EngMab AG for $600 million.

In January 2017, the company announced it would acquire Delinia for $775 million, increasing the company's autoimmune disease therapy offerings.

In January 2018, Celgene announced it would acquire Impact Biomedicines for $7 billion, adding fedratinib, a kinase inhibitor with potential to treat myelofibrosis.

Also in January 2018, the company announced it would acquire Juno Therapeutics for $9 billion.

US headquarters in Summit, New Jersey
The company's Summit headquarters are located along the 7.3-mile main line of the abandoned Rahway Valley Railroad. Some have advocated for the railbed's conversion to a pedestrian and cyclist linear park and rail trail.

Acquisition by Bristol-Myers Squibb 
In January 2019, the company announced it would be acquired by Bristol-Myers Squibb for $74 billion ($95 billion including debt), a deal that would become the largest pharmaceutical company acquisition ever. Celgene shareholders would receive one BMY share as well as $50 in cash for each Celgene share held, valuing Celgene at $102.43 a share; representing a 54% premium to the previous days closing price. The activist investor Starboard Value LP opposed the deal, nominating five alternative potential directors on the Bristol-Myers board. The deal was approved by shareholders in April 2019.

In August 2019, Amgen announced it would acquire the Otezla drug programme from Celgene for $13.4 billion, as part of Celgene and Bristol-Myers Squibb's merger deal. The Bristol-Myers acquisition closed on November 20, 2019.

In November 2019, Bristol-Myers Squibb (BMS) announced that it has completed its acquisition of Celgene following the receipt of regulatory approval from all government authorities required by the merger agreement and, as announced on April 12, 2019, approval by Bristol-Myers Squibb and Celgene stockholders.

Company origin and acquisition history
The following is an illustration of the company's major mergers and acquisitions and historical predecessors (this is not a comprehensive list):

 Celgene (Spun off from Celanese in 1986, acquired by Bristol-Myers Squibb in 2019)
 Signal Pharmaceuticals, Inc (Acq 2000)
 Anthrogenesis (Acq 2002)
 Pharmion Corporation (Acq 2008)
 Gloucester Pharmaceuticals (Acq 2009)
 Abraxis BioScience Inc (Acq 2010)
 Avila Therapeutics, Inc (Acq 2012)
 Quanticel (Acq 2015)
 Receptos (Acq 2015)
 EngMab AG (Acq 2016)
 Delinia (Acq 2017)
 Impact Biomedicines (Acq 2018)
 Juno Therapeutics (Acq 2018)
 AbVitro (Acq 2016)
 RedoxTherapies (Acq 2016)

Executive history 
In March 2016, Bob Hugin, the company's long serving CEO, retired from his position and took the role of executive chairman.  Bob Hugin was succeeded in the CEO role by Mark Alles.  At the same time, Jacqualyn Fouse was named as the company's president and COO; Fouse had joined the company in 2010 as the CFO.  Effective June 30, 2017, Dr. Fouse will purportedly step down and be succeeded by Scott Smith, president of the company's Global Inflammation & Immunology Franchise, who joined the company in 2008. Dr. Fouse has been voted out by the board of directors on 2 April 2018.

Finances 
For the fiscal year 2017, Celgene reported earnings of US$2.539 billion, with an annual revenue of US$13.003 billion, an increase of 15.8% over the previous fiscal cycle. Celgene's shares traded at over $74 per share, and its market capitalization was valued at over US$51.8 billion in November 2018.

Products 
As of 2019, Celgene focused on oncology and immunology. Cancer drugs include Revlimid (lenalidomide) and Pomalyst (pomalidomide) and the immunology drug Otezla (apremilast) accounted for around 90% of the company's total revenue as of 2019.

Product-related history 
In July 1998, Celgene received approval from the FDA to market Thalomid for the acute treatment of the cutaneous manifestations of moderate to severe ENL.

In April 2000, Celgene reached an agreement with Novartis Pharma AG to license d-MPH, Celgene's chirally pure version of RITALIN. The FDA subsequently granted approval to market d-MPH, or Focalin, in November 2001.

In December 2005, Celgene received approval from the FDA to market Revlimid for the treatment of patients with transfusion-dependent anemia due to Low- or Intermediate-1-risk MDS associated with a deletion 5q cytogenetic abnormality with or without additional cytogenetic abnormalities. Focalin XR was later launched by Celgene and Novartis in 2005.

In May 2006, Celgene received approval for Thalomid in combination with dexamethasone for the treatment of patients with newly diagnosed multiple myeloma.

In June 2007, Celgene received full marketing authorization for Revlimid in combination with dexamethasone as a treatment for patients with multiple myeloma who have received at least one prior therapy by the European Commission.

Pipeline 
 Ozanimod is an oral, sphingosine 1-phosphate (S1P) receptor modulator that binds with high affinity selectively to S1P subtypes 1 (S1P1) and 5 (S1P5). Ozanimod causes lymphocyte retention in lymphoid tissues. The mechanism by which ozanimod exerts therapeutic effects in multiple sclerosis is unknown, but may involve the reduction of lymphocyte migration into the central nervous system. Ozanimod is in development for immune-inflammatory indications including ulcerative colitis and Crohn's disease.
 Celgene develops several products within several areas of research (MM, MDS, AML, Lymphoma, CLL, Beta-Thalassemia, Myelofibrosis, Solid Tumors, Inflammation & Immunology.

Litigation

Antitrust allegations
In 2009, Dr. Reddy's Laboratories requested, and Celgene refused to provide, a samples of Celgene's anticancer drug THALOMID (thalidomide).  Dr. Reddy's Laboratories sought the material for bioequivalency studies required to bring its own, generic, version of thalidomide to market. In response to the refusal, Dr. Reddy's Laboratories filed a Citizen's Petition with the FDA asking the Agency to adopt procedures that would ensure generic applicants the right to buy sufficient samples to perform bioequivalence testing of drugs that were subject to REMS distribution restrictions.

Celgene denied that it had behaved anti-competitively, arguing that the legislative history strongly suggested that Congress considered and rejected a proposed guaranteed access procedure like the one proposed by Dr. Reddy's. Celgene further argued that requiring innovator companies to sell their products to potential generic competitors would violate its intellectual property rights and subject it to liability risks in the event that patients were harmed in Dr. Reddy's studies.

In 2018, Celgene was at the top of a list of companies that the FDA identified as refusing to release samples to competitors to create generics.

Generic manufacturer Lannett Company initiated antitrust litigation that accused Celgene of using its REMS for THALOMID (thalidomide) to violate the anti-monopolization provisions of the Sherman Act. In early 2011, the district court denied Celgene's motion to dismiss. The case was set for trial beginning in February 2012, but the parties settled before the trial began, thereby postponing further judicial review of antitrust claims premised on alleged abuse of REMS distribution restrictions.

Fraud allegations
In July 2017, Celgene agreed to pay $280 million to government agencies to settle allegations that it caused the submission of false claims or fraudulent claims for non-reimbursable uses of its drugs Revlimid and Thalomid to Medicare and state Medicaid programs. In its July 2017 10-Q, Celgene disclosed that it resolved the matter in full for $315 million, including fees and expenses. The case was brought under the False Claims Act by Beverly Brown, a former Celgene sales representative.

See also

 Biotech and pharmaceutical companies in the New York metropolitan area
 Pharmaceutical industry in Switzerland
 Sutro Biopharma

References

External links

Bristol Myers Squibb
Pharmaceutical companies established in 1986
Biotechnology companies of the United States
Companies based in Union County, New Jersey
Summit, New Jersey
1986 establishments in New Jersey
Pharmaceutical companies based in New Jersey
Orphan drug companies
Life sciences industry
Companies formerly listed on the Nasdaq
American companies established in 1986
Biotechnology companies established in 1986
1980s initial public offerings
2019 mergers and acquisitions